Rathold (I) from the kindred Rátót was a Hungarian distinguished nobleman from the gens Rátót, who served as ispán (comes) of Somogy County in 1203.

He was the eldest son of voivode Leustach Rátót. As his brother, Julius I Rátót had no successors, Rathold was the ancestor of the Gyulafi branch of the Rátót clan.

References

Sources
  Zsoldos, Attila (2011). Magyarország világi archontológiája, 1000–1301 ("Secular Archontology of Hungary, 1000–1301"). História, MTA Történettudományi Intézete. Budapest. 

Rathold
13th-century Hungarian people